Exhibition Stadium was a stadium in Toronto, Canada.  

It may also refer to:

BMO Field, built on the same site, and called Exhibition Stadium during the 2015 Pan American Games
Exhibition Stadium (Chilliwack), British Columbia, Canada